Ambrosia maritima, the sea ragweed, is a species of herb in the family Asteraceae. They have a self-supporting growth form and broad leaves.

Sources

References

maritima
Flora of Malta